Asiaephorus narada is a moth of the family Pterophoridae that is endemic to China.

References

Moths described in 2003
Endemic fauna of China
Platyptiliini